was a Japanese football player. He played for Japan national team.

Club career
Kondo was born in Kariya on April 28, 1972. After graduating from Shizuoka Gakuen High School, he joined Matsushita Electric (later Gamba Osaka) in 1991. From 1992, he played as regular player at many positions, midfielder and side-back. However at 1996 Emperor's Cup on December 29, he hit his head against and opponent. An examination afterwards found a brain tumor. This match became his last match, and he left the club in June 1998. He played 133 games and scored 4 goals in the league.

National team career
On May 22, 1994, Kondo debuted for Japan national team against Australia. He played as right side-back. On May 29, he also played against France.

Death

On April 17, 2003, Kondo died of a brain tumor in Toyoake, Aichi, at the age of 30.

Club statistics

National team statistics

References

External links
 
 Japan National Football Team Database
 

1972 births
2003 deaths
Association football people from Aichi Prefecture
Japanese footballers
Japan international footballers
Japan Soccer League players
J1 League players
Gamba Osaka players
Association football midfielders
Association football defenders